The State Assembly — El Kurultai of the Altai Republic is the regional parliament of the Altai Republic, a federal subject of Russia. A total of 41 deputies are elected for five-year terms.

History
The origins of the national parliamentary system were laid in the history of the republic, when formed Mountain Duma and then Gorno-Altai Autonomous Oblast. State Assembly - EL Kurultai of the Altai Republic was established by the Supreme Council of the Republic of Altai of 14 October 1993 "On the reform of the representative bodies and local authorities in the Republic of Altai". This decree provided that "the supreme representative and legislative body of the Republic of Altai is the State Assembly - El Kurultai" of 27 deputies working on a permanent basis. Elections were held the same day as the elections to the State Duma of Russia. The powers of the Supreme Council stopped since the start of the new Parliament.

Structure
The structure of the National Assembly is made up of the committees, the number of which can vary and the Bureau. Speaker of the Parliament shall be elected at the first organizational session on an alternative basis by secret ballot. Also elected by secret ballot by the committee chair. The list of committee members is determined by the desire of deputies to work in a particular committee.

In the first convocation of 1993–1997. during the elections of December 12, 1993, 27 deputies were elected. The first organizational session was held on February 1–3, 1994. Chairman of the Parliament of 1 February was elected VI Chaptynov. First Deputy Prime Minister - Vladimir Volkov. Vice-Presidents - DI Tabaev. There were also ten people elected to the Presidency of the Parliament.

Elections

2019

See also
List of Chairmen of the State Assembly of the Altai Republic

References

External links
 

Politics of the Altai Republic
Altai
Altai